The 1947 Palestine Cup (HaGvia HaEretz-Israeli) was the fifteenth season of Israeli Football Association's nationwide football cup competition, and the last competed before the declaration of independence of Israel.

The competition reverted to its previous format, of each round decided with a single match. Maccabi Tel Aviv and Beitar Tel Aviv met at a tempestuous final, which was abandoned at the 88th minute, with Maccabi leading 3–2. After Beitar claimed scoring an equalising goal, which wasn't given, the crowd stormed the pitch and Beitar player Yom-Tov Menasherov took the cup and escaped the pitch with it undetected by the authorities.

Results

First round

Replay

Second round

Quarter-finals

Replay

Semi-finals

Final

References
100 Years of Football 1906–2006, Elisha Shohat (Israel), 2006

External links
 Israel Football Association website 

Cup
Israel State Cup
Israel State Cup seasons